Macchia d'Isernia is a comune (municipality) in the Province of Isernia in the Italian region Molise, located about  west of Campobasso and about  southwest of Isernia.

Macchia d'Isernia borders the following municipalities: Colli a Volturno, Fornelli, Isernia, Monteroduni, Sant'Agapito.

References

Cities and towns in Molise